Psephiocera is a genus of flies in the family Stratiomyidae.

Species
Psephiocera callosa James, 1967
Psephiocera cognata (Lindner, 1949)
Psephiocera flavipes Enderlein, 1914
Psephiocera marginata James, 1967
Psephiocera modesta (Lindner, 1949)
Psephiocera superba (Lindner, 1949)

References

Stratiomyidae
Brachycera genera
Taxa named by Günther Enderlein
Diptera of North America
Diptera of South America